Urbana is a comune in the province of Padua, in Veneto region of northern Italy with a population of 2,146 as of 2017.

References

Cities and towns in Veneto